Maci (1652–1739) was a Manchu Bordered Yellow Banner court official who lived in the Qing dynasty. He was from the Fuca clan, and was the eldest son of Mishan (米思翰).

Maci served as Ministry of War from 1691 to 1694, and Ministry of Revenue from 1692 to 1701. He was also a member of Grand Secretariat during Kangxi Emperor's reign, and was an important supporter of the 8th Prince Yinsi (Yunsi). In 1708, Maci, Tong Guowei (佟國維), Alingga (阿靈阿) and Olondai (鄂倫岱) proposed designating Yinsi as Crown Prince but was refused by the emperor. He was stripped of his official position and forced into house arrest.

Maci returned to politics after Yongzheng Emperor ascended the throne. He sat on the emperor's top advisory board along with Yunsi, Yunxiang, and Longkodo. He retired in 1735, and died in 1739.

Fuheng, Fucing were his nephews, and Empress Xiaoxianchun his niece. His son Fuliang (富良) used to serve as Xian (Manchu city) garrison general (西安驻防将军).

References

 
 

Grand Secretaries of the Qing dynasty
Qing dynasty politicians
1652 births
1739 deaths
Manchu politicians